The PFA Footballer of the Year Awards (or the Professional Football Association Footballer of the Year Awards) is an annual award ceremony created to formally recognise the most outstanding Australian soccer players playing abroad or in the A-League, as well as foreign players playing in the A-League. The inaugural ceremony took place on 11 June 2009 in Sydney.

Alex Tobin OAM Medal
The Alex Tobin OAM Medal is selected by the PFA Executive to a current or former player who demonstrates four outstanding attributes: leadership, achievement as a player, commitment to one's fellow professionals, and service and dedication to the game. The medal is named after the PFA's longest-serving president, Alex Tobin.

Men's Footballer of the Year Award
The Men's Footballer of the Year Award is awarded to Australia's best professional player playing overseas or in the A-League. Performances for national teams are also taken into account. The votes are cast monthly by all current male players who are PFA members. A final group of nominees is announced at the end of the season, the player with the highest number of votes becoming the eventual winner.

Women's Footballer of the Year Award

The PFA Women's Footballer of the Year is voted for by all current women's players who are PFA members, on a 3-2-1 basis.

Harry Kewell Medal

The Harry Kewell Medal is awarded to Australia's best male professional Under-23 player playing overseas or player of any nationality playing in the A-League. Performances for national teams are also taken into account. The votes are cast monthly by all current male players who are PFA members. A final group of nominees is announced at the end of the season, the player with the highest number of votes becoming the eventual winner. The medal is named after one of Australia's most famous and successful players, Harry Kewell.

Young Women's Footballer of the Year Award

PFA Community Medal

A-League Men Team of the Season
The A-League Men Team of the Season is awarded to the league's best players selected in a 4-3-3 formation with the best coach also selected. The team is selected by the PFA Awards Committee, a group of former Socceroos, football analysts and journalists.

2008–09
 
Substitutes: 

Manager:  Aurelio Vidmar, Adelaide United

Referee:  Strebre Delovski

2009–10
 
Substitutes: 

Manager:  Vitezslav Lavicka, Sydney FC

Referee:  Strebre Delovski

2010–11
 
Substitutes: 

Manager:  Ange Postecoglou, Brisbane Roar

Referee:  Gerard Parsons

2011–12
 
Substitutes: 

Manager:  Graham Arnold, Central Coast Mariners

Referee:  Strebre Delovski

2012–13
 
Substitutes: 

Manager:  Tony Popovic, Western Sydney Wanderers

Referee:  Strebre Delovski

2013–14
 
Substitutes: 

Manager:  Mike Mulvey, Brisbane Roar

Referee:  Strebre Delovski

2014–15

Substitutes:

2015–16

Only one player from the two finalists (Adelaide United and Western Sydney Wanderers) were picked for the starting XI.

Substitutes: 

Manager:  Guillermo Amor, Adelaide United

Referee:  Strebre Delovski

Venue of the season: Etihad Stadium

2016–17

Substitutes: 

Manager:  Graham Arnold, Sydney FC

2017–18

Substitutes: 

Manager:  Graham Arnold, Sydney FC

2018–19

Substitutes: 

Manager:  Tony Popovic, Perth Glory

2019–20

Substitutes: 

Manager:  Ufuk Talay, Wellington Phoenix

2020–21

Substitutes: 

Manager:  Patrick Kisnorbo, Melbourne City

2021–22

Substitutes: 

Manager:  Tony Popovic, Melbourne Victory

A-League Women Team of the Season

2016–17

Substitutes: 

Referee: Kate Jacewicz

2017–18

Substitutes:

2018–19

Substitutes: 

Coach:  Jeff Hopkins, Melbourne Victory

2019–20

Substitutes: 

Coach:  Rado Vidosic, Melbourne City

2020–21

Substitutes: 

Coach:  Jeff Hopkins, Melbourne Victory

2021–22

Substitutes: 

Coach:  Adrian Stenta, Adelaide United

A-League Team of the Decade
The Team of the Decade covers the first ten seasons of the A-League. i.e. 2005–06 to 2014–15.

Substitutes

Manager:  Ange Postecoglou

Referee:  Strebre Delovski

References

External links
 PFA Awards Official Website

Australian soccer trophies and awards
Australia
2009 establishments in Australia
Awards established in 2009
Annual events in Australia
Women's association football trophies and awards